The Rennell whistler (Pachycephala feminina) is a species of bird in the family Pachycephalidae, which is endemic to the Rennell Island in the Solomon Islands. It was split from the Bismarck whistler by the IOC in 2016.

Taxonomy and systematics 
It has been variably considered a subspecies of a widespread golden whistler (P. pectoralis) or treated as a separate species, but strong published evidence in favour of either treatment is limited, and further study is warranted to resolve the complex taxonomic situation.

Status
The Rennell whistler is assessed as Near Threatened by the IUCN due to its small population and habitat loss within a restricted range.

References 

Rennell whistler
Birds of Rennell Island
Rennell whistler